Tigrioides euscia is a moth in the family Erebidae. It was described by George Hampson in 1914. It is found on New Guinea, where it is only known from the Star Mountains in Papua New Guinea.

References

Moths described in 1914
Lithosiina